Nasarawa South Senatorial District covers five local governments namely Awe, Doma, Keana , Lafia and Obi. Lafia is the headquarters (collation centre) of Nasarawa South Senatorial District. Tanko Al-Makura of the All Progressives Congress, APC is the current representative of Nasarawa South Senatorial District.

List of senators representing Nasarawa South

References 

Nasarawa State
Senatorial districts in Nigeria